Semi-Pro is a 2008 American sports comedy film. The film was directed by Kent Alterman in his directorial debut, written by Scot Armstrong, and produced by Jimmy Miller. It stars Will Ferrell, Woody Harrelson, André Benjamin and Maura Tierney, set during the final season of the American Basketball Association and telling the story of a fictional ABA team desperate to survive the league's merger with the NBA. The film was shot in Los Angeles near Dodger Stadium (in the gym of the Los Angeles City Fire Department Training Center), in Detroit, and in Flint, Michigan. Released in theaters on February 19, 2008 and released on DVD and Blu-ray Disc on June 3, 2008, it was the last film from New Line Cinema before they were absorbed by Warner Bros. Pictures. As of 2021, it is the only film directed by Kent Alterman. The film received generally negative reviews, with critics criticizing the script, though Ferrell’s performance received praise.

Plot 
In 1976, Jackie Moon is a singer who used the profits from his one-hit wonder, "Love Me Sexy", to buy a basketball team in the American Basketball Association (ABA), the Flint Tropics, becoming the owner, head coach, starting power forward, and pre-game announcer. At a team owner's meeting, the ABA Commissioner announces a plan to merge the league with the National Basketball Association (NBA), but only four teams will move to the more established league. The Tropics, the worst team in the league, are in danger of dissolving. Jackie, thinking fast, argues that the teams with the four best records should be merged and the Commissioner accepts.

Jackie trades the team's washing machine to the Kentucky Colonels for Ed Monix, a backup point guard who won an NBA Championship with the Boston Celtics, but did not play during the playoffs. The Commissioner reveals that in addition to finishing in the top four, the Tropics will also need at least 2,000 fans at every remaining home game. Jackie begins to stage extremely desperate stunts in order to boost attendance, like wrestling a bear named Dewey, as well as the increased intensity of Clarence Withers, the Tropics' best player. Monix takes over as offensive and defensive coordinator and starting point guard, leaving Jackie as the head coach. Monix trains the team rigorously with a play he calls the "Puke", as the players are to run it until they literally throw up.

From Monix's training, the Tropics go on a winning run, moving from last to fifth. Jackie gets a visit from the Commissioner. The NBA does not think that Flint has a large enough media market and will not allow the Tropics into the league even if they beat the first place San Antonio Spurs in the last game of the season. Jackie admits that he stole "Love Me Sexy" from a napkin his mother wrote on three weeks before she died. Realizing that all his assets are basically stolen, Jackie trades Withers to the Spurs so that he may realize his dream of playing in the NBA. Monix reassembles and inspires the team to leave everything on the court, while they may not be able to continue the franchise after this season, they have come very far and still have a lot to prove.

Going into the Spurs game, which Jackie declares the "MegaBowl", the Tropics are in fifth place and with a win they would make it into fourth, even though they will not be allowed into the NBA. The Tropics fall behind quickly, and Jackie is knocked unconscious when fouled hard at the end of the first half. Withers decides he has seen enough and rejoins the Tropics in their locker room, destroying his chance at the NBA with the Spurs. An unconscious Jackie imagines that he is in heaven with his mother. He apologizes for stealing her song and she gives him a weapon in order to win. Starting the second half, the Tropics reveal their new weapon: the alley-oop. With the return of Withers, the alley-oop is very effective, but the referee initially calls the play a foul. After some persuasion by Jackie and Monix, the referee is convinced that it is a legitimate play. With seconds left, they have closed to within two points, 117–115, when the Spurs execute a defence against the Alley-Oop. Monix calls a time-out and tells them to run the "Puke", executing multiple razzle-dazzle passes ending with the ball in Jackie's hands under the netbut he gets fouled hard again with two seconds left, giving him 2 free throws. Shooting granny style, Jackie sinks the first basket. The second bounces off the rim but Monix tips in the rebound right at the buzzer for two points to win, sparking a wild celebration in the arena and the streets of Flint.

The Spurs' coach offers Withers his position back, while the now-former ABA Commissioner offers Jackie a position on the staff of the NBA Assistant Commissioner, as a marketing director.

Cast

Cameos

In addition, former American Basketball Association players, Artis Gilmore and George Gervin, appear in uncredited roles as customers in a restaurant, while the already extensive list of Saturday Night Live cast members includes Jerry Minor, in the uncredited role of DJ at the nightclub.

Dewie the Bear
The 5-year-old,  male grizzly bear named Rocky appeared in the film in a scene where Will Ferrell's character wrestles him to promote his basketball team. Stuntman and trainer Randy Miller doubled for Ferrell during the wrestling match with the bear. On April 22, 2008, seven weeks after Semi-Pro entered wide release, the bear bit 39-year-old Stephan Miller (Randy Miller's cousin and fellow trainer) on the neck, killing him.

Marketing
A number is shown in the teaser trailer 1-800-TROPICS, when called played a recorded message of Jackie Moon talking about season ticket packages for the 1976 season.
Several ads for Anheuser-Busch were filmed featuring Will Ferrell in character as Jackie Moon that were aired during Super Bowl XLII.  Some of the ads touted humorous promotional items with offers expiring in November 1977.
A music video was released with Jackie Moon singing his 'hit' "Love Me Sexy".  
Ferrell appeared in character as Jackie Moon in TV spots for Old Spice deodorant.                                          
 A prescreening at the Alamo Drafthouse in Austin, Texas two weeks prior to the box office debut featured an appearance by Will Ferrell and director Kent Alterman. In order to obtain entrance to the theater, all viewers had to wear a basketball uniform similar to the one worn by Ferrell in the film.
 An official Jackie Moon Semi-Pro costume was released in summer 2008 for Halloween.
 A Sports Illustrated swimsuit issue spread featured Ferrell with Heidi Klum.

Reception

Critical reception
Semi-Pro received generally negative reviews from critics. The review aggregator Rotten Tomatoes gives the film an approval score of 22% based on 161 reviews, with an average rating of 4.5/10. The site's critical consensus reads, "Semi-Pro is an intermittently funny, half-hearted attempt at sports satire, and one of Will Ferrell's weaker cinematic efforts." Metacritic reported the film had an average score of 47 out of 100, based on 29 reviews. Matt Zoeller Seitz of New York Times said, "Semi-Pro finds the sweet spot between sports melodrama and parody, and hammers it for 90 diverting minutes."

Peter Travers writing for Rolling Stone stated, "when the script, by Scott Armstrong, shoots air balls, Ferrell is a slam-dunk." Claudia Puig of USA Today said, "Although not exactly a slam dunk, Semi-Pro is definitely more than semi-funny." In his review for The Village Voice, Robert Wilonsky gave the film 2 stars of a possible 4 and wrote that director Kent Alterman, "valiantly tries to tweak the formula by adding a dash more sincerity and humanity to the froth but doesn't get too adventurous. But in the end, it's comedy comfort food, something powdered poured from a box."

Box office performance
In its opening weekend, the film grossed $15 million in 3,121 theaters in the United States and Canada, holding the number one position at the box office. Alicia Chang of the Associated Press described the opening as "lackluster" compared to Ferrell's previous sports spoofs Talladega Nights, which opened with $47 million, and Blades of Glory, which opened with $33 million. The basketball film went on to gross $33,479,698 domestically and $10,405,206 internationally, for a total of $43,884,904 worldwide.

Awards
2008 ESPY Awards
 Best Sports Movie ESPY Award

2008 Teen Choice Awards
 Teen Choice Award for Choice Movie - Comedy (Nominated)

Home media
The film was released on DVD and Blu-ray Disc on June 3, 2008. There is a theatrical R-Rated version DVD and a 2-Disc "Let's Get Sweaty" Unrated Edition DVD and Blu-ray Disc. Special features include unrated deleted scenes and more.

Soundtrack

The soundtrack for the film was released on February 26, 2008 and featured songs by LaBelle, WAR, Curtis Mayfield, Will Ferrell, among others. "Love Me Sexy" is sung by the fictional Jackie Moon (played by Will Ferrell).

 "Love Me Sexy" – Will Ferrell
 "Get Da Funk Out Ma' Face" – Brothers Johnson
 "Lady Marmalade" – LaBelle
 "The World Is a Ghetto" – WAR
 "Tell Me Something Good" – Ronnie Laws
 "Mr. Big Stuff" – Jean Knight
 "Give Me Just a Little More Time" – Chairmen of the Board
 "Why Can't We Be Friends" – WAR
 "Walking in Rhythm" – The Blackbyrds
 "Dance to the Music" – Sly & The Family Stone
 "Love Rollercoaster" – Ohio Players
 "Que Sera, Sera (Whatever Will Be, Will Be)" – Sly & The Family Stone
 "Move On Up" – Curtis Mayfield
 "Shining Star" – Elijah Kelley

See also
 The Fish That Saved Pittsburgh
 Slap Shot

References

External links

Official trailer

2008 films
2000s sports comedy films
American Basketball Association
American basketball films
American sports comedy films
Films set in Michigan
Films shot in Los Angeles
Films shot in Michigan
Films set in 1976
Flint, Michigan
New Line Cinema films
Films scored by Theodore Shapiro
Films with screenplays by Scot Armstrong
2008 directorial debut films
2008 comedy films
San Antonio Spurs
2000s English-language films
2000s American films
Films about National Basketball Association